Acianthera sonderiana is a species of orchid.

sonderiana